Group B of the 2021 Rugby League World Cup is one of four groups in the 2021 Rugby League World Cup, which will be played in 2022. The group comprises automatic qualifiers Australia and Fiji as well as Scotland and Italy, who both qualified through the 2019 European play-off tournament.

The pool draw was made on 16 January 2020. The fixtures were announced on 21 July 2020. A revised schedule was issued on 19 November 2021 following the postponement of the tournament from 2021 to 2022.

Standings

Matches

Australia vs Fiji

Scotland vs Italy

Australia vs Scotland

Fiji vs Italy

Fiji vs Scotland

Australia vs Italy

References

External links 

 https://www.rlwc2021.com/

2021 Rugby League World Cup